A runway safety area (RSA) or runway end safety area (RESA) is defined as "the surface surrounding the runway prepared or suitable for reducing the risk of damage to airplanes in the event of an undershoot, overshoot, or excursion from the runway."

Past standards called for the RSA to extend only 60m (200 feet) from the ends of the runway. Currently the international standard ICAO requires a 90m (300 feet) RESA starting from the end of the runway strip (which itself is 60m from the end of the runway), and recommends but not requires a 240m RESA beyond that. The standard dimensions have increased over time to accommodate larger and faster aircraft, and to improve safety.

Historical development

In the early years of aviation, all airplanes operated from relatively unimproved airfields. As aviation developed, the alignment of takeoff and landing paths centered on a well defined area known as a landing strip. Thereafter, the requirements of more advanced aircraft necessitated improving or paving the center portion of the landing strip. The term "landing strip" was retained to describe the graded area surrounding and upon which the runway or improved surface was constructed.

The primary role of the landing strip changed to that of a safety area surrounding the runway. This area had to be capable, under normal (dry) conditions, of supporting aircraft without causing structural damage to the airframe or injury to the occupants. Later, the designation of the area was changed to "runway safety area," to reflect its functional role. The runway safety area enhances the safety of aircraft that undershoot, overrun, or veer off the runway, and it provides greater accessibility for firefighting and rescue equipment during such incidents. One of the difficulties is that overshooting aircraft do not always run off the end of the runway at relatively slow speed; they leave from the side of the runway (as in the TAM Brazilian Airlines Flight 3054 accident), they run off the end at such a high speed that they would overrun any safety area (as in the Air France Flight 358 accident in Toronto), or they land well short of the runway (as in the British Airways Flight 38 accident at Heathrow).

Recent changes in the United States
The U.S. Federal Aviation Administration (FAA) recognized that incremental improvements inside standard RSA dimensions can enhance the margin of safety for aircraft. This is a significant change from the earlier concept where the RSA was deemed to end at the point it was no longer graded and constructed to standards. Previously, a modification to standards could be issued if the actual, graded and constructed RSA did not meet dimensional standards as long as an acceptable level of safety was provided.

Today, modifications to standards no longer apply to runway safety areas. Instead, FAA airport regional division offices are required to maintain a written determination of the best practicable alternative for improving non-standard RSAs. They must continually analyze the non-standard RSA with respect to operational, environmental, and technological changes and revise the determination as appropriate. Incremental improvements are included in the determination if they are practicable and they will enhance the margin of safety.

Warnings in Canada
After the Air France Flight 358 accident in Toronto, Ontario, in 2005, the Transportation Safety Board of Canada (TSB) recommended changes to the runway safety areas on runways at Canadian airports. Since 2007, TSB suggest that airports employ EMAS (engineered material arresting system) on Canadian runways by constructing a 300 m (as per ICAO standard of 60 m + 240 m or FAA 300 m) overrun at the end of all runways.

The EMAS can be of benefit where the aircraft leaves the runway neatly at the end, and there are several clear examples where it saved an aircraft from a serious accident. All EMAS are tailor fitted to a specific runway, allowing them to offer the best performance within the available area. Typically, slopes, distance, type of aircraft etc. are taken into consideration. The predicted and controlled braking force will slow the aircraft without damaging it under all weather conditions. If an EMAS is damaged, it will require repair, but this does not mean that the runway must be closed after an overrun, as the rest of the EMAS arrestor bed remains effective even if there are furrows caused by tire tracks across a portion of the bed.

See also
Engineered materials arrestor system
British Airways Flight 38
Obstacle-free zone

References

Aviation safety